Maɗa is a Chadic language spoken in northern Cameroon. It has 17,000 speakers.

The Maɗa (17,000 speakers) inhabit the Maɗa massif, on the eastern edge of the Mandara Mountains, between the Wuzlam massif to the north and the Zélgwa massif to the south. They live in the canton of Madakalkoss, arrondissement of Tokombéré, department of Mayo-Sava, Far North Region.

Vowels 
Maɗa has seven vowels.

Consonants 
Maɗa has 25 consonants in total, including implosives, lateral fricatives, and prenasalized stops.

Notes

References 
 Daniel Barreteau & André Brunet.  2000.  Dictionnaire mada.  Berlin:  Reimer.
 http://pbase.phon.chass.ncsu.edu/language/322

Biu-Mandara languages
Languages of Cameroon